The Hardee's Pro Classic (formerly known as the Movie Gallery Pro Tennis Classic and the Dothan Pro Tennis Classic) is a tennis tournament held on outdoor clay courts at the Westgate Tennis Center in Dothan, Alabama. It has been held since 2001 and is part of the ITF Women's Circuit as a $80,000 event. In the past it has been a $25,000 event (2001) and a $75,000 event (2002–2009).

Past finals

Singles

Doubles

External links 
 

ITF Women's World Tennis Tour
Clay court tennis tournaments
Tennis tournaments in the United States
Tennis tournaments in Alabama
Sports in Dothan, Alabama
Recurring sporting events established in 2001